"Sweet like Chocolate" is a song by British garage music duo Shanks & Bigfoot with vocalist Sharon Woolf. It was released as a single on 17 May 1999 and was included on the duo's debut album, Swings and Roundabouts, the following year. Vocals on the track are sung by Sharon Woolf, who had also sung on their track "Straight from the Heart", which was released under their previous band name, 'Doolally'.

"Sweet like Chocolate" was originally released on vinyl in 1998 as a promotional single, which had a short-run pressing of 1,000 copies. When released as an official single in 1999, it topped the UK Singles Chart for two weeks and reached the top 10 in Australia, Ireland, and New Zealand. The song was the first UK garage track to hit number one on the UK Singles Chart. The Guardian listed the song at number 20 in their list of "The Best UK Garage Tracks" in 2019.

Music video
A computer animated music video was produced for the song by 3D graphic designers "Visualisation Services". It is set in a surreal world where every object, except for the protagonist, is constructed out of chocolate.

Chart performance
"Sweet like Chocolate" topped the UK Singles Chart for two weeks in May 1999, achieved platinum status, and was the eighth-biggest-selling single of 1999. It was the first song to top the UK Singles, Dance, R&B, and Indie charts, though not simultaneously. Internationally, the song was a top-10 hit in Ireland, Australia, and New Zealand; in the latter two countries, the song was certified platinum and gold, respectively. It also charted in Flanders, Germany, the Netherlands, Sweden, and Switzerland. In Canada, the song peaked at number 14 on the RPM Dance 30 chart in September 1999.

Track listings

UK CD single
 "Sweet like Chocolate" (Shanks & Bigfoot radio edit) – 3:28
 "Sweet like Chocolate" (Metro 7-inch remix) – 3:13
 "Sweet like Chocolate" (Shanks & Bigfoot original mix) – 6:55
 "Sweet like Chocolate" (Ruff Driverz vocal) – 5:46

UK 12-inch single
A. "Sweet like Chocolate" (Shanks & Bigfoot original mix) – 6:55
B. "Sweet like Chocolate" (Ruff Driverz vocal) – 5:46

UK cassette single
 "Sweet like Chocolate" (Shanks & Bigfoot radio edit) – 3:28
 "Sweet like Chocolate" (Ruff Driverz vocal) – 5:46

European CD single
 "Sweet like Chocolate" (Metro 7-inch remix) – 3:13
 "Sweet like Chocolate" (Shanks & Bigfoot radio edit) – 3:28

Australasian CD single
 "Sweet like Chocolate" (Metro 7-inch remix) – 3:13
 "Sweet like Chocolate" (Shanks & Bigfoot radio edit) – 3:28
 "Sweet like Chocolate" (Shanks & Bigfoot original mix) – 6:55
 "Sweet like Chocolate" (Ruff Driverz vocal) – 5:46

Credits and personnel
Credits are adapted from the UK CD single liner notes.

Studios
 Recorded at Soul II Soul Studios (London, England)
 Mastered at Battery Studios (London, England)

Personnel
 Shanks & Bigfoot – production
 Danny Langsman – writing
 Steven Meade – writing
 Sharon Woolf – vocals, backing vocals
 David Newell – engineering
 Streaky Gee – mastering

Charts

Weekly charts

Year-end charts

Certifications

References

1998 songs
1999 singles
Animated music videos
Jive Records singles
Shanks & Bigfoot songs
UK Singles Chart number-one singles
UK Independent Singles Chart number-one singles